The 2005–06 VfB Stuttgart season was 41st season in the Bundesliga. The club competed in Bundesliga, UEFA CUP, and the DFB Cup. In the Bundesliga, Stuttgart ended up in ninth place. They were knocked out by Middlesbrough in the first knockout round of the UEFA Cup.

Giovanni Trapattoni came to the club in June 2005, replacing Matthias Sammer, who left the club after one season.

The summer transfer window saw several changes to the squad. Important first-team players such as Kevin Kurányi, Alexander Hleb, and Philipp Lahm were replaced with Jon Dahl Tomasson, Thomas Hitzlsperger, and Ludovic Magnin.

During Trapattoni's 20 games at the helm, Stuttgart produced poor results (5 wins, 12 draws, and 3 losses). Denmark internationals Jon Dahl Tomasson and Jesper Grønkjær openly criticised their coach, claiming he was afraid to attack. Trapattoni immediately responded by dropping both players to the bench. With the atmosphere in the team worsening, he was sacked after just seven months, on 9 February 2006, reportedly for "not fulfilling the ambitions of the club". He was replaced as manager by Armin Veh. His first match was a 2–1 loss against Arminia Bielefeld on matchday 21 of the 2005–06 Bundesliga on 11 February 2006. On 18 April 2006, his contract was extended until summer 2007.

First-team squad 
Season squad

Transfers

In

Out

Appearances and goals

|-
!colspan=14 style=background:#dcdcdc; text-align:center|Goalkeepers

|-
!colspan=14 style=background:#dcdcdc; text-align:center|Defenders

|-
!colspan=14 style=background:#dcdcdc; text-align:center|Midfielders

|-
!colspan=14 style=background:#dcdcdc; text-align:center|Forwards

|}

Competitions

Bundesliga

Classification

Matches

DFB-Pokal

First round

Second round

UEFA Cup

First round

First leg

Second leg

Stuttgart won 2–1 on aggregate.

Groups

Group G

All times CET

Round of 32

First leg

Second leg

2–2 on aggregate. Middlesbrough won on away goals.

References

Notes

External links
VfB Stuttgart official website

VfB Stuttgart seasons
Stuttgart